Donovan Jedd Ebanks (born 2 February 1988) is a Caymanian footballer who plays as a defender. He has represented the Cayman Islands during World Cup qualifying matches in 2008 and 2011

References

Association football defenders
Living people
1988 births
Caymanian footballers
Cayman Islands international footballers
Elite SC players
Cayman Islands under-20 international footballers